The Tony Award for Best Performance by a Leading Actress in a Musical is awarded to the best actress in a musical, whether a new production or a revival. The award has been given since 1948, but the nominees who did not win have only been publicly announced since 1956.

History
The award was not presented in 1947 or 1985. Ken Mandelbaum wrote about the 1985 season: "Things get bad enough musically to require the elimination of the Best Musical Actor and Actress categories, as well as the choreography prize." There have been three ties in this category, in 1958, 1962 and 1968.

In 1965, Liza Minelli, age 19, became the youngest actress to win the award, a record she still holds today. She is followed by Lea Salonga, age 20, in 1991. In 2017, Bette Midler, age 71, became the oldest actress to win the award, a record she still holds today. She is followed by Ruth Brown, age 61, in 1989.

Winners and nominees

1940s

1950s

1960s

1970s

1980s

1990s

2000s

2010s

2020s

Multiple wins

4 Wins
 Angela Lansbury

3 Wins
 Mary Martin
 Gwen Verdon

2 Wins
 Lauren Bacall
 Christine Ebersole
 Sutton Foster
 Patti Lupone
 Liza Minnelli
 Donna Murphy
 Bernadette Peters
 Chita Rivera

Multiple nominations

8 Nominations
 Chita Rivera

7 Nominations
 Sutton Foster

6 Nominations
 Kelli O'Hara
 Bernadette Peters

5 Nominations
 Patti LuPone
 Donna Murphy
 Gwen Verdon

4 Nominations
 Carol Channing
 Angela Lansbury
 Mary Martin

3 Nominations
 Julie Andrews
 Jessie Mueller
 Christine Ebersole
 Dee Hoty
 Dorothy Loudon
 Audra McDonald
 Ethel Merman
 Liza Minnelli
 Faith Prince

2 Nominations
 Lauren Bacall
 Stephanie J. Block
 Georgia Brown
 Carolee Carmello
 Kristin Chenoweth
 Carmen Cusack
 Sandy Duncan
 Nanette Fabray
 Dolores Gray
 Barbara Harris
 Judy Kuhn
 LaChanze
 Beth Leavel
 Beatrice Lillie
 Rebecca Luker
 Marin Mazzie
 Patina Miller
 Idina Menzel
 Eva Noblezada
 Laura Osnes
 Tonya Pinkins
 Alice Ripley
 Sherie Rene Scott
 Alexis Smith
 Elaine Stritch
 Inga Swenson
 Nancy Walker

Multiple character wins
3 Wins
 Anna Leonowens from The King and I
 Rose from Gypsy

2 Wins
 Desiree Armfeldt from A Little Night Music
 Celie Harris Johnson from  The Color Purple
 Dolly Gallagher Levi from Hello, Dolly!

Multiple character nominations

5 Nominations
 Rose from Gypsy

4 Nominations
 Peter Pan from Peter Pan and Jerome Robbins' Broadway

3 Nominations
 Anna Leonowens from The King and I
 Charity Hope Valentine from Sweet Charity
 Mrs. Lovett from Sweeney Todd
 Phyllis Rogers Stone from Follies

2 Nominations
 Amalia Balash from She Loves Me
 Bess from Porgy and Bess
 Caroline Thibodeaux from Caroline, or Change
 Celie Harris Johnson from The Color Purple
 Desiree Armfeldt from A Little Night Music
 Dolly Gallagher Levi from Hello, Dolly!
 Dot / Marie from Sunday in the Park with George
 Eliza Doolittle from My Fair Lady
 Ella Peterson from Bells Are Ringing
 Ensign Nellie Forbush from South Pacific
 Fiona MacLaren from Brigadoon
 Kim from Miss Saigon
 Lilli Vanessi / Katharine from Kiss Me, Kate
 Lily Garland / Mildred Plotka from On the Twentieth Century
 Lizzie Curry from 110 in the Shade
 Marian Paroo from The Music Man
 Mother from Ragtime
 Reno Sweeney from Anything Goes
 Ruth Sherwood from Wonderful Town
 Sarah Brown from Guys and Dolls
 Velma Kelly from Chicago

Musicals with multiple lead nominations
 New Girl in Town – Thelma Ritter (winner) and Gwen Verdon (winner)
 Company – Susan Browning and Elaine Stritch
 Follies – Dorothy Collins and Alexis Smith (winner)
 Chicago – Chita Rivera and Gwen Verdon
 Annie – Dorothy Loudon (winner) and Andrea McArdle
 Dreamgirls – Jennifer Holliday (winner) and Sheryl Lee Ralph
 The Rink – Liza Minnelli and Chita Rivera (winner)
 Black and Blue – Ruth Brown (winner) and Linda Hopkins
 Guys and Dolls – Josie de Guzman and Faith Prince (winner)
 Urinetown – Nancy Opel and Jennifer Laura Thompson
 Wicked – Kristin Chenoweth and Idina Menzel (winner)
 War Paint – Christine Ebersole and Patti LuPone
 The Prom – Caitlin Kinnunen and Beth Leavel

Multiple awards and nominations
Actress who have been nominated multiple times in any acting categories

See also
Drama Desk Award for Outstanding Actress in a Leading Role in a Musical
Laurence Olivier Award for Best Actress in a Leading Role in a Musical

References

External links
 Internet Broadway Database Awards Archive
 Official Tony Awards Website Archive

Theatre acting awards
Tony Awards
Awards established in 1948
1948 establishments in the United States
Awards for actresses